Gravelly is an unincorporated community in Yell County, Arkansas, United States, located on Arkansas Highway 28,  west-southwest of Plainview. Gravelly has a post office with ZIP code 72838.

Education
It is within the Two Rivers School District. The district operates Two Rivers High School.

Notable person
Actor Arthur Hunnicutt was a native of Gravelly.

References

Unincorporated communities in Yell County, Arkansas
Unincorporated communities in Arkansas